Kavus was the 32nd ruler of Shirvan. He was a son of Shirvanshah Keykubad I and older brother of Prince Sultan Muhammad.

Co-reign
According to sources, he began ruling in name of his father in 1348, due to Keykubad's advanced age. He was styled as "Lord of Shamakhy and Shirvan" in youth. He sought to gain strong alliance with Chupanid Malek Ashraf, as he travelled to his court and submitted to him. However, Malek Ashraf then unexpectedly killed a nobleman named amir Wafa b. Haji Shahriban in front of his eyes. Kavus was horrified and immediately returned to Shirvan. Soon, Malek Ashraf sent his envoys Khawja Abdulhay and Akhijuq Malik to Shirvan and to express his desire to marry a daughter of Shirvanshah Keykubad I. Kavus denied the demand, and, frustrated because of denial, Malek marched on Shirvan but was repelled and forced to make peace. He attacked Shirvan once again in the winter of 1347, but Kavus and his father took shelter in the well guarded castles of Shirvan. After this invasion, sources do not mention Shirvanshah Keykubad I, and he probably died of old age between 1348 and 1356.

Sole reign
After death of his father he forged an alliance with Golden Horde khan Jani Beg and invited him to Azerbaijan. Aided by Shirvanshahs, the Golden Horde army captured Tabriz. Malek Ashraf was executed by Jani Beg on demands of Kavus in 1357. Kavus sent his troops under his son Prince Noder to fight Chupanid remnants led by Akhijuq Malik, who defeated them two times.

Relations with Jalayirids
His relationship with Shaikh Uways was complicated, as he had submitted to him at first, but rebelled against in him 1364. After 4 years of resistance he was imprisoned and was taken to Tabriz. After 3 months of imprisonment he was pardoned and released in return of fealty.

Death and legacy
He was a patron of the arts and science. Arif Ardabili, a poet from Ardabil, lived in his palace and was a tutor for next Shirvanshah Hushang. Kavus died in 1372 of natural causes.

References

1372 deaths
Year of birth unknown
14th-century Iranian people